Don Hoffman is an American author of children’s literature. His published works include A Very Special Snowflake and Sparky the Fire Dog. He is also the founder of Peek-A-Boo Publishing and its LGBTQ-oriented imprint, RainbowKidz.

Selected bibliography 
 Sparky the Fire Dog (2011)
 A Very Special Snowflake (2008)
 A Counting Book with Billy & Abigail (2004)
 Good Morning, Good Night Billy & Abigail (2004)
 Abigail Is a Big Girl: Are You a Big Girl Too? (2002)
 Billy Is a Big Boy (2002)

References

External links 
 Official Website
 Peek-A-Boo Publishing Website
 A Very Special Snowflake Website

Year of birth missing (living people)
Living people
American children's writers
American book publishers (people)